Inyi is a town in Enugu State, Nigeria.

Geography
Inyi is a town located in the Oji River Local Government Area within Enugu State in Nigeria. It's about 60 kilometers to Enugu City, the capital of Enugu State, 45 kilometers to Awka, the capital of Anambra State, and 35 kilometers to Nnewi via Ufuma Town. It is located in the southeastern area of Nigeria and is largely populated by members of the Igbo ethnic group, an area also known as the Waawa people.

The name INYI is derived from a tree called Inyi, under which the father of inyi descendants was found and adopted.

Inyi comprises nine villages, namely:Enugwu-Inyi, Umuome, Obune, Agbariji, Amankwo, Umuagu, Nkwere, Alum and Akwu. Recently the government of Enugu created five autonomous communities out of Inyi. These autonomous communities are Agbada-Inyi (Umuome, Obune, Amankwo and Nkwere), Ugwu-Inyi (Agbariji and Akwu), Enugu Inyi, Alum, and Umuagu.

It is bordered by Achi, Awlaw, Akpugoeze, Ugwuoba (all in the Oji River Local Government Area) and Ufuma.

History
According to oral history and cultures in practice, the forebearer Inyi himself was born in Agun'ese, near Umueji a village in Ufuma, Anambra State. According to oral tradition, Inyi was said to be a special child, displaying heroic tendencies and characteristics which were far beyond the ordinary. For example, Inyi was said to have erupted the upper set of teeth first before the lower set of teeth, something considered out of the ordinary in Ufuma and Igbo land then. He was therefore taken across the Mmamu River to fend for himself at that very tender age.
Accounts here are conflicting about the farmer and or the hunter who picked him up under an Inyi tree {from where the name Inyi was adopted}. Often called Inyinese or Inyi agu nese Omeire depicting bravery, fearlessness and heroism, the young man at the time displayed intrepid characteristics that set him out early in life as a hero in his own right and by all standards.
The first account narrates that the hunter Ji-ala adopted him and took him to his community at the time and further postulates that Inyi helped Ji-Ala to father a child via Ji-Ala's daughter because the latter had problems of high male child mortality, which actually made him to adopt Inyi as a child in the first place. The descendants of this arrangement said to hold the spiritual powers of beholding taboos and abomination(igbuju ala, iji-ala and Ipufu-aru)  had nurtured Inyi to manhood, protecting him spiritually and otherwise. Inyi had since progressed therefrom into the modern Inyi going forward.
The offspring of Inyi and the daughter of Jiala has remained intact as a community in Inyi called UmuJiala(children of Ji-ala). That blood convergence of Patriarch Jiala and Patriarch Inyi in UmuJiala of the Present has made UmuJiala the S custodians of the Odu-na-ala and Ome-na-ala (mores or laws)  of all Inyi Nation's religion, culture, honor,  etiquette, customs, manner and affairs per Igbo Mores (per Dr. Francis Arinze 1978:30).
The second narrative makes reference to Nkwere as the farmer adopter and who had raised the baby Inyi among his children [boys and girls]. That the boy Inyi was very strong, hard working and courageous so much so that he outshone all the other children. At the time, the Patriarch, Nkwere invited a priest of the gods to offer sacrifices and to prepare life sustaining monuments. The priest [dibid] had requested all the children to go out and bring a clinchfull of soldier ants without flinching, clinging nor balking. None of the Nkwere children could do it. The young Inyi was eventually called to perform the act and he did so returning with a clinch full of soldier ants with no sign of cringe nor balk. 
From this brave act, the priest of the gods proclaimed hence that Inyi shall be great and will have many children and children's children.
Going forward therefrom, the man Inyi had five sons (Ome, Enugu, Obune, Iji and Nkwo) of his own, who were often referred as Inyi Agu n'ese Omeire, or the Five Active Tigers. One of his sons, Iji, had a son Agbara and a daughter Chieze, who founded Agbariji Village and Alum Chieze Village, respectively. The other four sons founded their respective villages by name; Umuome, Enugwu Inyi, Obune and Amankwo. 
As time went on with migration and movement of people, Umuagu village was adopted, so also the descendants of Nkwere were annexed as Nkwere Inyi. lately too, Akwu Inyi village migrated from Enugwu Akwu Achi and hosted by Agbariji Villages, bringing the number of Inyi villages to nine.

Ji-Ala's descendants had remained as a community in Inyi clan -ISI ALA keeping the custodians of what binds and unites the Inyi Nations together and servicing the other villages with the spiritual gift powers of beholding taboos and abomination(igbuju ala, iji-ala and Ipufu-aru) until the colonization of Nigeria took place and were administratively absorbed into Enugu Inyi and Ajala Village into Umuome Inyi as well, but UmuJiala remain as the 'Titular Fathers" holding the ancestral Ahiajioku Shrine, Nji-ichie Jiala/Inyi/Enugwu shrines, Agwu-Ikpa(the ancestral healing shrine of the Inyi Clan, Ooji Inyi(pronounce as Ooohji - meaning the ancestral staff of a patriarch from Jiala to Inyi).
REFERENCE BOOKS :   <Inyi Home Affairs by Professor C. Agodi Onwumechili 2006 :4-11,Coming A Long Way 2010 at page 6 by the same Prof. C. A. Onwumechili, 2. See this quotation of Professor Onwumechili in the IGBO TRADITIONAL GOVERNMENT WITHOUT KINGS by Professor Cyril Agodi Onwumechili at the AHIAJIOKU LECTURES Year 2000 published in pages 101 -110 in the Book of Emeritus Prof. Alexander O. E Animalu, Professor(Mrs.) Francisca N. Okeke, and Jeff Unaegbu (2011). ‘Biography of the Eminent Pioneer Geophysicist -CYRIL AGODI ONWUMECHILI –Professor of Physics’
 >

Places of interest
Inyi has many tourist sites, including the Nwachighi stream; Ajala Inyi, Okpu-ogho, Oji arum; Iyi oku; the Sacred Heart Church; Nkwo market, the biggest market in Enugu State; Ngwara stream for swimmers, Ogba Anike and others.

Inyi is situated centrally, with fertile arable land, clay deposit and very good people.
inyi is more like a place for pottery in the earlier period though. this is also shown in the status of the woman with a pot.

Education
Between 1976 and 1977, two secondary schools were built in Inyi by community effort and with approval from the State Ministry of Education, formerly Anambra. These schools are the Boys High School Inyi (now known as Model Comprehensive Boys Secondary School) and Girls Secondary School Inyi.

Today, there are many more secondary and tertiary institutions in Inyi and prominent among them is the School of Health Technology Inyi, which is a school of paramedical studies located in Enugu-Inyi.

Culture

Inyi people are known to be a very hospitable and cheerful race. They are most notable for the manner in which they entertain their guests after the initial offering of kola nut (Oji) in any simple or complex gathering/Event. 
Inyi people traditional entertain their visitors by preparing Ncha  by form of a delicay, served with fish and palm wine.

Washed down with a fresh Palm wine (White Palm Sap water) from local Palm wine tapping, which has been noted to be beneficial to the sight with its yeast content, when drank in moderation, as it is also intoxicating.
Inyi people enjoy the company of each other so much so that they are said to drink from the same cup without any fears or reservations.
The people of Inyi are primarily farmers, wine tappers and petty traders. The women are proficient in pottery and the making of abacha varieties - food items deriving from cooked cassava tubers shredded to sizes and types. It is this abacha that forms the main component of the delicacy called ncha. 
Inyi can be said to be the headquarters of ncha in Nigeria. A visitor is offered this delicious dish just after the presentation of kola nuts.

Weather Condition in Inyi

Weather conditions in Inyi consists of two major seasons, the Dry season and the Wet season (Raining season).

The dry season begins in November and extends till April, but between December and January, the days are at its driest and windy, nights and early morning are colder. This is generally referred to as the Harmattan season. The northeastern winds come often in spells that last from a few days to more than a week. Nights become chilly and temperatures may even drop below the 18 °C, coming back to an average 32 °C during the day with occasional peaks above the 36 °C during the day. The hot harmattan winds evaporate body moisture quickly and give a sensation of coolness to the skin. It is these Sahara winds that carry large amounts of dust to the state, leaving a thick fog in the morning and a hazy sky for the rest of the day behind.
 
However, the rain season falls between May and October with the heaviest rains in June and July during this season, the rain is mostly preceded by strong winds and skies filled with lightning and Thunder. In the absence of rain, weather is clear and cool, around 26 °C; during the day and 20 °C in the night, however humidity prevails. The annual rainfall in Enugu State is between 1.5 and 2 metres.

People from Inyi
It is pertinent to acknowledge the Legal and intellectual reform brought to Inyi people by Pa High Chief Richard Chukwunakpunze who was among the pioneer Court-Clerk of the Southern Nigeria and equally a descendant of His Royal Majesty EZE(Igwe) Maduekesi, Lion King of Inyi Kingdom and other sphere of Influence. Richard Chukwunakpunze(pioneer Court-Clerk),Beniah Madueke, Francis Emeribe, John Anyaji, Basillos Onyebuchi,EzeChukwu Maduekesi(1st Warrant Chief), UdeEkwo Nwokolo,  Udeagbara Uzoka, Edward Mba, Alfred Obika (Enugwu), Micheal Amuche, Matthew Anyafuluzo, Ezekiel Ike and Pa Obika (Agbariji) and a host of others were the pioneers who received Christianity about the 1917 and founded the two early churches which formed the bedrock of western civilization and education with the founding of Primary Schools at the time. Later their son's Nze Aaron Obika, Prof Agodi Onwumechili, Morris Chukwu, Felix Madueke, Adrain Orah, Beneth Maduka and their peer group co-founded Inyi Welfare Association (IWA) and worked tirelessly to uplift the literacy level of the town and founded Inyi Boys Comprehensive High School and Inyi Girl's Secondary School. 
Some prominent Inyi people include
 Eko Chukwukelu, who taught the first professor from Inyi, Cyril Agodi Onwumechili, in primary school.
 Pa.Wilfred Anyagbakaba Chukwunakpunze
 Sir Cyril Chukwunakpunze
 Prof Cyril Agodi Onwumechili
 Rear Admiral Allison Madueke, Former Military Governor of Anambra and Imo States of Nigeria. He later became the Head and Chief of the Naval Staff of the Nigerian Navy. His wife was a one time Minister for Petroleum Resources
Chief Barrister Matthew Orji Udeh (Legal Practitioner and author of five books on various aspects of Inyi history)
Chief John Chukwuka Udeagbala (Former Secretary to Enugu State Government/Deputy Governor under Military Rule, Retired Permanent Secretary Enugu State, Former Chairman Niger Gas Limited Emene, Former Chairman Enugu State Civil Service Commission)
 Madam Joy Iheanyi Chukwunakpunze (nee ilobuba, president Maduekesi women Groups)
Lady Caroline Udeh (Retired Chief Nursing Officer Enugu State)
 Barrister Austin Ilo -Nigeria Customs,Oji Nma Egbo-Ogu Inyi
 Engr. Chike Madueke, Agbalanze Inyi, the National President of Inyi Towns Union,ITU, President Sunrise Club of Inyi, works in The Presidential Taskforce on Power in the Presidency
 Chukwuekezie Emmanuel
 Dr. Mike Madu 
 Rev. Fr. Raphael Egwu
 Arc. BOB Oforbuzo
Pharmacist Toomu Igweobi (CEO, AC Drugs Limited)
 Hon Ugochukwu Madu - former Deputy Chairman Oji-River LGA
 Okoli Ikechukwu
 Hon. Ernest Mattah- first Executive Chairman, Oji River local government area
 Chibueze Chris Obika - a lawyer based in the United Kingdom
 Chukwuekezie Magnus
 Chukwuekezie Bede
 Rufus Ilo
 KGB Oguakwa
 Sir Charles Mbaoji
 Lady Esther Umesie
 Mrs. Joy Orah
 Wing Commander C.O. Udeh
Barrister Damian Ihuefo Udeh
Raymond Obi Udeh (Estate Surveyor & Valuer, CEO Sabrina Properties Limited, Vice President Sunrise Club of Inyi)
 Barrister Frank Umesie
 Dr. EC Onyeka
 Professor Martin Obi
 Dr. Eddie Floyd Igbo
 Celsus Ndubueze Mbah
 Rear Admiral A. Amuche
 Commodore Uba Basil Ajala
 Igwe Mike Offor Mberedeogu
 Hon. Obi Madueke 
 President General Ugwu Inyi. # PDP Enugu West Zonal Chairman # CEO Cobi Computers
 Chief Nick Eze
 Emeribe Ejike Benjamin
 Sir Calistus Iloabueke
Engr. Levi Madueke, African Union Addis Ababa
 Chief Ben Oraamulugo - Nigeria Custons, Nke Nke Enyi Inyi
 Engineer Goddy Madueke - Honorable Commissioner of Works, Enugu state, Nigeria
 AU Obingene
 Prince Dominic C Ebube
 Ozo Casmir Nwokolo
 John Unaegbu
 Jeff Unaegbu
Sir Zephaniah Udenze
 Onuzulike Okezie
 Dr. DAE Orjiako
 Prince (Barrister) Victor Ogoegbule Mba-Inyi
 Chudi Igwe - Diamound Bank 
 Prince Christian Ekenedirichukwu Ezeh
 Walter Mbah - Union Bank
 Alloy Odili Onu, The Presidency
 Engr Emeka Iloegbulam - NLNG
 Engr Ken Amuche
 Lady Rose Kaja - Wife of Late Vice Admiral Chijioke Kaja
 Bishop Jonah Ilonuba- former Bishop of Nsukka
 Prof Floyd Igbo
 Dave Okey Chukwuka
Engr Basil Ezeh (Ezehata 1 of Inyi Kingdom)
 Dr. Ugochukwu Mata- Anesthesiologist based in Dublin,Ireland 
 Late chief Ike Augustine illoanyaegbunam (Ezekwesiri 1 n' inyi )
 Sam Onuzulike Onyekere
 Dr. Livinus Orjiakor
 Johnbull Onyeji - Ikenga na Malaysia 
 Barr. Chris Iloabanafo
 Emeka Iloputaife
 Rev. Obiora Nwozor 
 Major Iheukwumere Christopher ILoabanafo
 Hillary Obi. Ohio Mac
 Emeribe william ugochukwu
 Celestine Ekene Onyebuchi
 Valentine Uche Mberedeogu.
 Nneamaka Iloabanafo - Etisalat Nig
Mr Ike Gift Ifunanya (TechGuru)

References 

 Chukwunakpunze. C.B (2011) Rural Development; A Discourse on Inyi Town and its Health Center, paper abstract, University of Nigeria.

Towns in Enugu State